Pedregal may refer to:

Panama
Pedregal, Boquerón, Chiriquí, Panama
Pedregal, David, Chiriquí, Panama
Pedregal, Panamá District, Panamá Province, Panama
 Pedregal (Panama Metro), a rapid transit station in Panama City, Panama

Other
Pedregal (Costa Rica), a rock art site
El Pedregal, province of Guadalajara, Spain
Jardines del Pedregal, Mexico City, Mexico
Pedregal River, northern Venezuela
El Pedregal Volcano in Honduras